Jackie Dinkins (January 22, 1950 – March 7, 1983) was an American professional basketball player. He spent one season in the National Basketball Association (NBA) with the Chicago Bulls during the 1971–72 season as a small forward.

Professional career 
Born in Gadsden, South Carolina, he was drafted by the Bulls in the ninth round (150 overall) from Voorhees College. In his one NBA season, Jackie appeared in eighteen games, averaging 2.5 points, 1.1 rebounds, and 0.4 assists per game. He later played in Belgium.

From 1973 to 1975, he played two seasons for RZ (named Transol RZ for sponsorship reasons) in the Dutch Eredivisie. Dinkins helped RZ become a popular basketball team in Rotterdam. He helped RZ win the 1973–74 Eredivisie title, the first in club history. The next season, they played in the 1974–75 FIBA European Champions Cup, where Dinkins was the leading scorer in both games (22 and 25 points) in the first round against Crystal Palace.

In 1978, Dinkins signed with Standard Liège of the Belgian League.

Personal 
While playing in Liège Dinkins was diagnosed with a brain tumor. He traveled frequently to Boston for treatment. He died on March 7, 1983, in Liège at age 33.

Dinkins was in the process of becoming a Belgian naturalized citizen before his death.

External links

References

1927 births
1983 deaths
African-American basketball players
American expatriate basketball people in Belgium
American expatriate basketball people in the Netherlands
American men's basketball players
Basketball players from South Carolina
Chicago Bulls draft picks
Chicago Bulls players
College men's basketball players in the United States
People from Richland County, South Carolina
Small forwards
20th-century African-American sportspeople